The 2016 United States presidential election in Arizona was held on Tuesday, November 8, 2016, as part of the 2016 United States presidential elections in which all 50 states plus the District of Columbia participated. Arizona voters chose electors to represent them in the Electoral College via a popular vote, pitting the Republican Party's nominee, businessman Donald Trump, and running mate Indiana Governor Mike Pence against Democratic Party nominee, former Secretary of State Hillary Clinton, and her running mate Virginia Senator Tim Kaine. Arizona has 11 electoral votes in the Electoral College.

Despite the rest of the country swinging to the right, Arizona decreased its margin of victory from 9.0% in 2012 to only 3.5% in 2016, thus making it one of 11 states (along with the District of Columbia) to do so. Notably, Maricopa County, the state's most populous county, went more Democratic than the state as a whole. The county had not voted for a Democrat since Harry S. Truman in 1948. Therefore, Trump's narrow win in the county suggested the Republican Party was losing ground in the state. In fact, the county and the state would go on to vote Democratic in 2020. Trump's margin of victory in Arizona was the smallest for any Republican who won the presidency since Arizona's founding in 1912, with Calvin Coolidge's 5.8% victory in 1924 being the second closest.

Primary elections

Democratic primary

Six candidates appeared on the Democratic presidential primary ballot:
 Bernie Sanders
 Hillary Clinton
 Rocky De La Fuente
 Martin O'Malley (withdrawn)
 Henry Hewes
 Michael Steinberg

Opinion polling

Results

Detailed results per congressional district

Republican primary

Fourteen candidates appeared on the Republican presidential primary ballot:
 Jeb Bush (withdrawn)
 Ben Carson (withdrawn)
 Chris Christie (withdrawn)
 Ted Cruz
 Carly Fiorina (withdrawn)
 Lindsey Graham (withdrawn)
 Mike Huckabee (withdrawn)
 John Kasich
 George Pataki (withdrawn)
 Rand Paul (withdrawn)
 Marco Rubio (withdrawn)
 Rick Santorum (withdrawn)
 Tim Cook
 Donald Trump

Green primary

The Arizona Green Party held its primary on March 22. Jill Stein won with 82% of the vote, and the overall number of voters that took place in the primary saw an increase from 561 in 2012 to 770 in 2016. Only two candidates qualified for the primary:

General election

Polling

The first poll conducted in March 2016 showed a tie between Clinton and Trump. From March 2016 to October, the polling in this normally Republican state was quite close, with neither candidate seriously leading. In late October, Trump gained momentum and won every pre-election poll in the weeks leading up to the election. The final poll showed Trump leading Clinton 46% to 41% and the average of the final 3 polls showed Trump leading 47% to 43%, which was accurate compared to the results.

Predictions
The following are final 2016 predictions from various organizations for Arizona as of Election Day.

Statewide results

Results by county

By congressional district
Trump won 5 of 9 congressional districts. Both candidates won a district held by the other party.

Turnout

Voter Turnout was 74.2% with 2,661,497 ballots cast out of 3,588,466 voters.

Electors
Arizona had 11 electors in 2016. All of them voted for Donald Trump for president and Mike Pence for vice president.

The electors were
 Bruce Ash
 Walter Begay
 Sharon Giese
 Robert Graham
 Alberto Gutier
 Jerry Hayden
 Carole Joyce
 Jane Pierpoint Lynch
 J. Foster Morgan
 James O'Connor
 Edward Robson

Analysis

Donald Trump won Arizona with a margin of 3.5%, a reduced margin from Mitt Romney's 9.0% margin in 2012. Arizona was among the eleven states in which Hillary Clinton outperformed Barack Obama's margin in 2012, primarily due to an increase in Hispanic voter turnout in southern Arizona, including heavily populated Maricopa County. This was the first election in which Republicans won only a plurality of the state since 1992. 

Maricopa County in particular went from a 10.7% margin of victory for Romney in 2012 to a 2.8% margin of victory for Trump, one of only three times that a Democrat held the county's margins to single digits since 1952. Indeed, the only other times were 1964 and 1996. Clinton also came the closest of any Democrat to winning Yuma County since the county was separated from La Paz County in the 1980s. Other rural counties that had been won by Bill Clinton in the 1990s continued to trend in a Republican direction. In terms of percentage of the vote, Trump's strongest support was in the northwest of the state whereas Clinton did best in the southern-central region.

See also 
 2016 Democratic Party presidential debates and forums
 2016 Democratic Party presidential primaries
 2016 Green Party presidential primaries
 2016 Republican Party presidential debates and forums
 2016 Republican Party presidential primaries

References

External links
 RNC 2016 Republican Nominating Process 
 Green papers for 2016 primaries, caucuses, and conventions

AZ
2016
Presidential